Fedorchuk is a surname of the Ukrainian origin. It is associated with the given Christian name of Theodore and its derivatives may include Fedoruk and Fedorenko.

It may refer to:
 Dean Fedorchuk, Canadian ice hockey coach

 Valeriy Fedorchuk, Ukrainian footballer
 Vitaly Fedorchuk, Soviet political leader
 Sergey Fedorchuk, Ukrainian chess player

See also
 

Ukrainian-language surnames